Insectolaelaps is a genus of mites in the family Digamasellidae. There are at least 20 described species in Insectolaelaps.

Species
These 20 species belong to the genus Insectolaelaps:

 Insectolaelaps armatus (Hirschmann, 1954)
 Insectolaelaps bialowiezae (Hirschmann & Wisniewski, 1982)
 Insectolaelaps euarmatus (Hirschmann, 1960)
 Insectolaelaps eustructurus (Hirschmann, 1960)
 Insectolaelaps hirsutus (Hirschmann, 1960)
 Insectolaelaps ipidoquadrisetus (Wisniewski & Hirschmann, 1983)
 Insectolaelaps japanoarmatus (Hirschmann & Wisniewski, 1982)
 Insectolaelaps javae (Wisniewski & Hirschmann, 1989)
 Insectolaelaps kielczewskii (Skorupski & Gwiazdowicz, 1992)
 Insectolaelaps latoarmatus (Hirschmann & Wisniewski, 1982)
 Insectolaelaps latopini (Hirschmann & Wisniewski, 1982)
 Insectolaelaps neoarmatus (Hirschmann & Wisniewski, 1982)
 Insectolaelaps nidiphilus (Wisniewski & Hirschmann, 1983)
 Insectolaelaps pini (Hirschmann, 1954)
 Insectolaelaps pinisimilis (Hirschmann, 1960)
 Insectolaelaps quadrisetoides (Hirschmann & Wisniewski, 1982)
 Insectolaelaps quadrisetosimilis (Hirschmann & Rühm, 1955)
 Insectolaelaps quadrisetus (Berlese, 1920)
 Insectolaelaps volnyi (Wisniewski & Hirschmann, 1991)
 Insectolaelaps zvoleniensis (Wisniewski & Hirschmann, 1984)

References

Acari